Orteguaza River is a river of Colombia, located in the Department of Caqueta. It is part of the Amazon River basin.

See also
List of rivers of Colombia

References
Rand McNally, The New International Atlas, 1993.

Rivers of Colombia